Estelle Cascino (born 13 March 1996) is a French tennis player.

Cascino has career-high WTA rankings of No. 406 in singles and No. 111 in doubles. She has won four singles titles and 20 doubles titles on tournaments of the ITF Women's Circuit.

Cascino made her Grand Slam main-draw debut at the 2019 French Open after receiving a wildcard for the doubles tournament, partnering Elixane Lechemia.

Grand Slam performance timelines

Singles

Doubles

WTA 125 tournament finals

Doubles: 2 (2 runner-ups)

ITF Circuit finals

Singles: 12 (4 titles, 8 runner–ups)

Doubles: 34 (20 titles, 14 runner–ups)

References

External links
 
 

1996 births
Living people
French female tennis players
Tennis players from Marseille